Gold nuggets of various sizes have been found throughout the world. Historically, they are melted down and formed into new objects. Three of the biggest nuggets come from the Brazilian Serra Pelada Mine. Most of the large nuggets were melted down into ingot form and so only have historical records of their size and mass.

Formation
A gold nugget is a naturally occurring piece of native gold. Watercourses often concentrate nuggets and finer gold in placers. Nuggets are recovered by placer mining, but they are also found in residual deposits where the gold-bearing veins or lodes are weathered. Nuggets are also found in the tailings piles of previous mining operations, especially those left by gold mining dredges.

Nuggets are gold fragments weathered out of an original lode.  They often show signs of abrasive polishing by stream action, and sometimes still contain inclusions of quartz or other lode matrix material. A 2007 study on Australian nuggets ruled out speculative theories of supergene formation via in-situ precipitation, cold welding of smaller particles, or bacterial concentration, since crystal structures of all of the nuggets examined proved they were originally formed at high temperature deep underground (i.e., they were of hypogene origin).    
 
Nuggets are usually 20.5K to 22K purity (83% to 92% by mass). Gold nuggets in Australia often are 23K or slightly higher, while Alaskan nuggets are usually at the lower end of the spectrum. Purity can be roughly assessed by the nugget color, the richer and deeper the orange-yellow the higher the gold content.  Nuggets are also referred to by their fineness, for example "865 fine" means the nugget is 865 parts per thousand in gold by mass. The common impurities are silver and copper. Nuggets high in silver content constitute the alloy electrum.   

Two gold nuggets are claimed as the largest in the world: the Welcome Stranger and the Canaã nugget, the latter being the largest surviving natural nugget. Considered by most authorities to be the biggest gold nugget ever found, the Welcome Stranger was found at Moliagul, Victoria, Australia, in 1869 by John Deason and Richard Oates. The Welcome Stranger is sometimes confused with the similarly named Welcome Nugget, which was found in June 1858 at Bakery Hill, Ballarat, Australia by the Red Hill Mining Company. It was melted down in London in November 1859.

Large size nuggets are still being found around the world. On 16 January 2013, a large gold nugget was found near the city of Ballarat in Victoria, Australia by an amateur gold prospector. The discovery has cast doubt on the common rumour that Victoria's goldfields were exhausted in the 19th century.

List of nuggets

See also

Bristol Diamonds
Geodes
List of emeralds by size
List of pearls by size
List of sapphires by size
List of individual gemstones

Bibliography 
Notes

References 

 

 - Total pages: 704
 - Total pages: 320
 - Total pages: 306

 - Total pages: 315
 - Total pages: 687
 - Total pages: 248

  
 - Total pages: 336 
 
 - Total pages: 224 

Nugget
 
Goldnuggets